Nebria retrospinosa is a species of ground beetle in the Nebriinae subfamily that can be found in Georgia and  Russia.

References

External links
Nebria retrospinosa at Fauna Europaea

retrospinosa
Beetles described in 1885
Beetles of Asia
Beetles of Europe